Marimar can mean:
 Marimar (Mexican TV series), a 1994 Mexican telenovela, starring Thalía, originally broadcast in 1994 on Televisa
 MariMar (2007 TV series), the first Philippine remake of the Mexican telenovela
 MariMar (2015 TV series), the second Philippine remake of the Mexican telenovela
 Metel El Amar, a 2016 Lebanese remake of the original Mexican telenovela
 Marimar Vega, a Mexican actress.